Glenn Kobussen (born 16 June 1989) is a Dutch professional footballer who plays for HHC Hardenberg as a midfielder.

Career
Born in Deventer, Kobussen has played for Feyenoord, Go Ahead Eagles and HHC Hardenberg. In February 2015 he extended his contract with HHC Hardenberg until mid-2017.

References

1989 births
Living people
Dutch footballers
Footballers from Deventer
Feyenoord players
Go Ahead Eagles players
HHC Hardenberg players
Eredivisie players
Eerste Divisie players
Tweede Divisie players
Derde Divisie players
Association football midfielders